The Microtheliopsidaceae are a family of fungi with an uncertain taxonomic placement in the class Dothideomycetes. A monotypic taxon, it contains the single genus Microtheliopsis.

References

External links 
 Index Fungorum

Dothideomycetes enigmatic taxa
Ascomycota families
Lichen families